Syed Adney Syed Hussein (born 29 November 1986) is a former Malaysian footballer who is now a football commentator and pundit in Malaysia.

He was born in Liverpool, England.

He has been capped by the Malaysian national team and also has played for the Malaysian Pre-Olympic squad.

He has openly expressed his wish to play in the English football league, and had trials with Middlesbrough FC and Darlington FC.

Honours

Kelantan

Malaysia Super League
Runners-up : 2010
 Malaysia Cup
 Winners (1): 2010

Malaysia

 Pestabola Merdeka
 Winners (1): 2007

References

External links
 Profile at selangorfc.com 
 Profile at footballmalaysia.com
 Profile at ifball.com
 

1986 births
Living people
Malaysian Muslims
Malaysian people of Malay descent
Malaysian footballers
Malaysia international footballers
Malaysian people of Arab descent
Malaysian people of Scottish descent
Footballers from Liverpool
Citizens of Malaysia through descent
British emigrants to Malaysia
Terengganu FC players
Kelantan FA players
Selangor FA players
Sabah F.C. (Malaysia) players
Negeri Sembilan FA players
ATM FA players
Malaysia Super League players
Association football goalkeepers
Footballers at the 2006 Asian Games
Asian Games competitors for Malaysia